Gerson Daniel Rodas Leiva (born 6 July 1990) is a Honduran footballer who plays as a midfielder for Honduras Progreso in the Liga Nacional de Fútbol de Honduras.

International career
Rodas scored two goals for the Honduras U-23 team in the 2012 CONCACAF Men's Olympic Qualifying Tournament semifinals against El Salvador which meant the qualification to the 2012 Summer Olympics.

Statistics

International goals

References

External links
 

1990 births
Living people
People from San Pedro Sula
Association football midfielders
Honduran footballers
Honduras international footballers
Real C.D. España players
Liga Nacional de Fútbol Profesional de Honduras players
2013 CONCACAF Gold Cup players